Wallace Smith Martindale III (born August 1930 in Philadelphia) is an American mathematician, known for Martindale's Theorem (1969) and the Martindale ring of quotients introduced in the proof of the theorem. His 1969 paper generalizes Posner's theorem and a theorem of Amitsur and gives an independent, unified proof of the two theorems.

Biography
Martindale received his Ph.D. in mathematics in 1958 from the University of Pennsylvania. He became a professor at the University of Massachusetts Amherst and retired there as professor emeritus in 1996.

He is the father of two daughters. When he was 81 years old, Martindale, with one of his daughters, climbed Mount Kilimanjaro.

Selected publications

Articles
 
 
 
 
 
  1975

Books

References

1930 births
Living people
20th-century American mathematicians
21st-century American mathematicians
Algebraists
University of Pennsylvania alumni
University of Massachusetts Amherst faculty